Knieperkohl is a pickled cabbage dish similar to sauerkraut. It contains not only white cabbage but also collard greens (or leaves of red cabbage) and kale, as well as grape leaf and cherry leaf. Knieperkohl is considered a representative dish of the historical region of Prignitz, now part of Brandenburg in Germany.

Knieperkohl is commonly served as an accompaniment to cured pork, such as Kassler, or sausages. Kohlwurst is a type of German sausage generally eaten with Knieperkohl. Potatoes are another typical accompaniment.

See also

References

Pickles
Plant-based fermented foods
Brandenburg cuisine
Cabbage dishes
Brassica oleracea dishes